Yanchep District High School was a public co-educational primary and high day school, located in the Perth suburb of Yanchep, Western Australia. It was opened in 1975 and closed in 2017, replaced by Yanchep Secondary College and Yanchep Lagoon Primary School.

History

Yanchep District High School opened in 1975 for Kindergarten to Year 7 students, as Yanchep Primary School. The school expanded to Year 8s in 1980, Year 9s in 1981 and Year 10s in 1982, and was renamed to Yanchep District High School in 1981. Yanchep District High School served students living in Yanchep, Two Rocks, Quinns Rocks, Butler and Woodridge.

In the 2010s, Yanchep and Two Rocks experienced large growth. Yanchep has a population of 4,247 in 2011, which more than doubled to 8,868 in 2016. As a result, Yanchep District High School did not have the facilities required to serve the number of students it had. The state government decided to construct a new high school in Yanchep, and convert the existing Yanchep District High School to be a primary school. Yanchep District High School closed at the end of 2017. In February 2018, Yanchep Secondary College opened to Year 7 to 11 students, at a new location with new facilities, and Yanchep Lagoon Primary School opened to Kindergarten to Year 6 students at the site of Yanchep District High School. Since then, most of Yanchep Lagoon Primary School has been demolished and rebuilt with more modern facilities.

Student numbers

Student numbers do not include kindergarten. Prior to 2015, Year 7 was designated as primary school.

See also

 List of schools in the Perth metropolitan area
 Yanchep Secondary College

References

External links
 Yanchep District High School (Archive)

Educational institutions established in 1975
1975 establishments in Australia
Defunct schools in Western Australia
2017 disestablishments in Australia
Educational institutions disestablished in 2017
Yanchep